Seminole (YT‑805) is a United States Navy .

Construction

The contract for Seminole was awarded 25 March 2008. She was laid down by J.M. Martinac Shipbuilding Corp., Tacoma, Washington and launched 6 November 2010.

Operational history

Seminole was delivered to the Navy 8 April 2011 at Yokosuka by the US-flagged heavy-lift ship BBC Houston. Seminole is assigned to Commander Fleet Activities Yokosuka.

References

 
 

 

Valiant-class tugboats
Ships built in Tacoma, Washington
2010 ships